Williamwood Parish Church is a Parish church of the Church of Scotland, serving the Williamwood area of Clarkston, East Renfrewshire. It is within the Church of Scotland's Presbytery of Glasgow.

The Building
Designed by Wilson & Son and Honeyman (now Honeyman, Jack and Robertson); Williamwood was dedicated 28 June 1937. Built in 1937 as a church extension charge, the church is a fine example of mid-1930s church architecture. Built in red brick with a short belltower, the original and somewhat austere interior has been upgraded and enriched. 

Williamwood Parish Church houses an early Allen Digital Organ. The two manual and pedal organ (Model MOS-600) was installed in 1971.  It was one of the first Digital Organs installed by the Allen Organ Company.

Ministry
Williamwood has only been served by 6 ministers. 

The current minister is Rev Jan Mathieson who took the charge after moving from Cawdor & Croy Parish. 

Previous minister - Rev Iain Reid, (2007 - 2014).  He had formerly been Chaplain to the Glasgow Royal Infirmary. He was assisted from September 2011 to May 2012 by Ann McCormick (Ordained Local Ministry Student).

Other ministers-
 Daniel Patterson 1937 - 1941 (who died whilst minister of Williamwood)
 John Stanley Pritchard 1942 - 1949 (who retired in 1970 from BBC Religious Broadcasting)
 Colin Campbell 1949 - 1989
 Rev G Hutton B Steel 1990 - 2006, is now minister of Aberdeen: High Hilton

See also
List of Church of Scotland parishes

External links
 Church Website

References
1. ^ http://presbyteryofglasgow.org.uk/images/resources/HistoricalDirectoryForGlasgowPresbytery.doc See page 330 (entry number 682)
2. ^ Church of Scotland Yearbook, 2008–9, 

Church of Scotland churches in Scotland
Churches in East Renfrewshire
1937 establishments in Scotland
Clarkston, East Renfrewshire